The Cima di Rosso is a mountain in the Bregaglia Range of the Alps, located on the border between Italy and Switzerland. It lies between the valleys of Bregaglia (in Graubünden) and Malenco (in Lombardy). On the western side of the mountain is the Forno Glacier.

References

External links
 Cima di Rosso on Hikr

Mountains of the Alps
Alpine three-thousanders
Mountains of Switzerland
Mountains of Lombardy
Italy–Switzerland border
International mountains of Europe
Mountains of Graubünden
Bregaglia